The Apollo 11 goodwill messages are statements from leaders of 73 countries around the world on a disc about the size of a 50-cent piece made of silicon that was left on the Moon in 1969 by the Apollo 11 astronauts.

The disc also carried names of the leadership of the Congress, the four committees of the House and Senate responsible for legislation related to the National Aeronautics and Space Administration (NASA), and NASA's top management, including past administrators and deputy administrators.

At the top of the disc is the inscription: "Goodwill messages from around the world brought to the Moon by the astronauts of Apollo 11." Around the rim is the statement: "From Planet EarthJuly 1969". The collected letters were given to the GCA Corp in Burlington MA which used a reduction camera to make a negative photomask containing all the letters plus an inscription around its edge at its final size. This mask was given to Sprague Electric Company of North Adams, Massachusetts which imaged it onto a silicon wafer and etched the pattern into the wafer. NASA head Thomas O. Paine proposed the idea to the U.S. State Department, and corresponded with world leaders to solicit their messages. These were enshrined by being photographed and reduced to 1/200 scale ultra microfiche silicon etching. The disc rests in an aluminum case on the Moon's Sea of Tranquility.

The disc was in a package in Buzz Aldrin's suit shoulder pocket along with some other memorial items. He was reminded about the package by Neil Armstrong while ascending the ladder of the Lunar Module Eagle to finish their EVA. He then dropped it to the surface. Later Houston requested and received confirmation they had placed it.

Countries represented in the messages

See also 
 List of time capsules
 Lunar plaque
 List of artificial objects on the Moon

References

External links
 Goodwill Messages at NASA
 Lunar Litter: A short film about things left behind on manned Moon missions, includes the goodwill message disc

Goodwill
1969 in the United States
1969 in spaceflight
Time capsules
Apollo program hardware
Message artifacts